Stefan Ulmer (born 1 December 1990) is an Austrian professional ice hockey Defenseman currently playing for HC La Chaux–de–Fonds in the Swiss League (SL).

Playing career
He began his professional career during the 2010–11 season, playing with HC Lugano of the Swiss National League A. Ulmer played his junior hockey in the Swiss junior leagues before embarking on a three-year stint (lasting from 2007–2010) with the Spokane Chiefs of the Western Hockey League, where he was a member of the team that won the 2008 Memorial Cup. He also made three appearances with the GCK Lions in the second-tier Swiss league, the National League B, during the 2006–07 season.

International play
Ulmer was named to Team Austria's official 2014 Winter Olympics roster on 7 January 2014.

Career statistics

Regular season and playoffs

International

References

External links

1990 births
Living people
Austrian ice hockey defencemen
EHC Biel players
GCK Lions players
HC La Chaux-de-Fonds players
HC Lugano players
Spokane Chiefs players
People from Dornbirn
Ice hockey players at the 2014 Winter Olympics
Olympic ice hockey players of Austria
HCB Ticino Rockets players
Sportspeople from Vorarlberg